

Winners and nominees

1980s

1990s

2000s

2010s

2020s

Records 
 Most awarded writer: María Zarattini, 4 times.
 Writers that won every nomination: Kary Fajer and Leonardo Bechini, 2 times.
 Most nominated writer: María Zarattini with 6 nominations.
 Most nominated writers without a win: Pedro Armando Rodríguez with 3 nominations.
 Youngest winners: María Zarattini and Eric Vonn, 31 years old.
 Youngest nominee: María Zarattini, 31 years old.
 Oldest winner: Yolanda Vargas Dulché, 70 years old.
 Oldest nominee: Delia Fiallo, 85 years old.
 Writers winning after short time: Leonardo Bechini by (La candidata, 2017) and (Caer en tentación, 2018), 2 consecutive years.
 Writers winning after long time:
 María Zarattini by (De pura sangre, 1986) and (Destino, 1991), 5 years difference.
 René Muñoz by (Quinceañera, 1988) and (De frente al sol, 1993), 5 years difference.
 Writers that winning the award for the same story:
María Zarattini (De pura sangre, 1986) and Martha Carrillo, Cristina García and Denisse Phiffer (Amor bravío, 2013)
Liliana Abud and Eric Vonn (Amor en silencio, 1989) and Martha Carrillo and Cristina García (A que no me dejas, 2016)

Foreign winning writers:
 María Zarattini from Italy
 René Muñoz from Cuba
 Eric Vonn from Guatemala
 Fernando Gaitán from Colombia
 Adrián Suar from United States
 Leonardo Padrón from Venezuela

References

External links 
TVyNovelas at esmas.com
TVyNovelas Awards at the univision.com

Original Story
Original Story
Original Story